Dae is a 1979 Yugoslavian short documentary film directed by Stole Popov. It was nominated for an Academy Award for Best Documentary Short. It depicts a group of Roma celebrating St. George's Day (May 6).

References

External links

Дае at the European Film Gateway

1979 films
1979 documentary films
1979 short films
Yugoslav short films
1970s short documentary films
Yugoslav documentary films